Mokre  is a village in the administrative district of Gmina Grudziądz, within Grudziądz County, Kuyavian-Pomeranian Voivodeship, in north-central Poland. It is located in the Chełmno Land in the historic region of Pomerania.

The village has a population of 930.

History

During the German occupation (World War II), in 1939, farmers from Mokre were murdered by the German SS and Selbstschutz in the large massacre of Poles committed in nearby Białochowo as part of the Intelligenzaktion.

References

Villages in Grudziądz County